Jony Talukdar (born 6 June 1993) is a Bangladeshi cricketer who has played for Dhaka Division. He made his Twenty20 debut for Uttara Sporting Club in the 2018–19 Dhaka Premier Division Twenty20 Cricket League on 26 February 2019.

See also
 List of Dhaka Division cricketers
 List of Prime Bank Cricket Club cricketers

References

External links
 

1993 births
Living people
Bangladeshi cricketers
Dhaka Division cricketers
Prime Bank Cricket Club cricketers
Uttara Sporting Club cricketers
People from Narayanganj District